Rampur Khas is a constituency of the Uttar Pradesh Legislative Assembly covering the city of Rampur Khas in the Pratapgarh district of Uttar Pradesh, India.

Rampur Khas is one of five assembly constituencies in the Pratapgarh Lok Sabha constituency. Since 2008, this assembly constituency is numbered 244 amongst 403 constituencies.

Members of Legislative Assembly
1952: Raja Ram Kisan, Indian National Congress
1957: Amola Devi, Indian National Congress
1962: Kunwar Tejbhan Singh, Socialist Party
1967: Ram Ajore Misra, Indian National Congress
1977: Kunwar Tejbhan Singh, Samyukta Socialist Party
1974: Babu Prabhakar Singh, Indian National Congress
1977: Kunwar Tejbhan Singh, Independent
1980: Pramod Tiwari, Indian National Congress (Indira)
1985: Pramod Tiwari, Indian National Congress
1989: Pramod Tiwari, Indian National Congress
1991: Pramod Tiwari, Indian National Congress
1993: Pramod Tiwari, Indian National Congress
1996: Pramod Tiwari, Indian National Congress
2002: Pramod Tiwari, Indian National Congress
2007: Pramod Tiwari, Indian National Congress
2012: Pramod Tiwari, Indian National Congress
2014: Aradhana Misra, Indian National Congress (By Poll)
2017: Aradhana Misra, Indian National Congress
2022: Aradhana Misra, Indian National Congress

Election results

2022 
Aradhana Mishra (Mona Tiwari), Indian National Congress candidate won the assembly election of 2022 Uttar Pradesh legislative Elections defeating Bharatiya Janata Party candidate Nagesh Pratap Singh (Chotte Sarkar).

2017
Indian National Congress candidate Aradhana Misra won in last Assembly election of 2017 Uttar Pradesh Legislative Elections defeating Bharatiya Janta Party candidate Nagesh Pratap Singh by a margin of 17,066 votes.

2014

2012

1996

References

External links
 

Assembly constituencies of Uttar Pradesh
Pratapgarh district, Uttar Pradesh